Brachyotum azuayense is a species of plant in the family Melastomataceae. It is endemic to Ecuador.  Its natural habitat is subtropical or tropical high-altitude shrubland.

References

azuayense
Endemic flora of Ecuador
Vulnerable plants
Taxonomy articles created by Polbot